Unity Christian High School may refer to any of the following:

Unity Christian High School (Barrie) in Barrie, Ontario, Canada
Unity Christian High School (Fulton) in Fulton, Illinois, United States
Unity Christian High School (Hudsonville) in Hudsonville, Michigan, United States